Saint Julius the Veteran, also known as Julius of Durostorum, is a Roman Catholic, Anglican and Eastern Orthodox saint and martyr. His feast day is 27 May.

Life
Julius of Durostorum was born to pagan parents. The date of Julius' conversion to Christianity is unknown. Julius served as a Roman soldier for 27 years first as a conscript, then returning as a [veteran], totaling seven military campaigns in total. Given the years and locations in which Julius served, Rev. Herbert Musurillo, S.J. writes that Julius likely served in the Legio XI Claudia. Julius was Christian his entire military career.

In accordance with the fourth edict of the Diocletian Persecution, Julius was brought to trial before the prefect, Maximus, after being arrested by Maximus' staff soldiers for refusing to make a public sacrifice to the Roman gods. Upon hearing of his military service, Maximus complimented Julius for being a wise and serious man. In gratitude for his military service, Maximus proposed Julius a bargain: if Julius offered the public sacrifice, Maximus would accept blame for the sin of the sacrifice and would give Julius freedom, a ten-year bonus payment, and immunity from future charges. Julius declined the offer and was sentenced to death. Julius was killed by the sword in Durostorum, the Roman camp in Moesia Inferior (modern Silistra,  Bulgaria) sometime between January and March of 304. Julius is widely considered a martyr.

Literature 
L. Arik Greenberg: My Share of God's Reward. Exploring the Roles and Formulations of the Afterlife in Early Christian Martyrdom, Reihe: Studies in Biblical Literature - Band 121, Lang, New York, Bern, Berlin, Bruxelles, Frankfurt am Main, Oxford, Wien 2009, S. 195–198.

External links
Julius the Veteran at Patron Saints Index
Saints of May 27 at St. Patrick Catholic Church in Washington D.C.
 Julius von Dorostorum

Notes 

Ancient Roman soldiers
Converts to Christianity from pagan religions
3rd-century births
4th-century Christian martyrs
Christian martyrs executed by decapitation
Military saints
Christians martyred during the reign of Diocletian